Romualdo Antonio Mon y Velarde (1749–1819) was a Spanish bishop. He was archbishop of Tarragona and archbishop of Seville (1816–1819).

References

1749 births
1819 deaths
Archbishops of Tarragona
Roman Catholic archbishops of Seville
Spanish bishops